al-Badhan is a Palestinian village in the Nablus Governorate in the North central West Bank, located  northeast of Nablus, and  to the north of Elon Moreh. According to the Palestinian Central Bureau of Statistics (PCBS), the village had a population of 2,422 inhabitants in mid-year 2006. The adjacent valley, Wadi al-Badhan (also known as Wadi Sajour), is a picturesque natural area located 5 km northeast of Nablus on the road leading to the Jordan Valley. The area is characterized by abundant springs and diversity of wildlife. The area is one of the most beautiful natural areas in the West Bank and has a nature reserve to preserve wildlife.

History
Al-Badhan has several sites of archaeological interest including 12 ancient watermills.

Scholars today hold that al-Badhan is to be identified with the Badan citied in the 2nd-century CE Mishnah and Tosefta, said to be a place then settled by Samaritans and renowned for its pomegranates. Badan is featured prominently in Samaritan tradition; According to one of these, the Israelites purified themselves at Badan after crossing the Jordan River and on their way to Mount Gerizim.

Ottoman period 
Victor Guérin passed through the region in 1870, where he described its geographical features.

Jordanian era
In the wake of the 1948 Arab–Israeli War, and after the 1949 Armistice Agreements, Badhan  came under Jordanian rule.

The Jordanian census of 1961 found 446 inhabitants.

1967, aftermath
Since the Six-Day War in 1967, al-Badhan has been under Israeli occupation. The Oslo II Accord, signed in 1995, divided the Israeli-occupied West Bank into three administrative divisions: Areas A, B and C. According to ARIJ, al-Badhan's village land is divided into 30% Area A, while the remaining 70% is defined as Area B.

Since 2003, al-Badhan has been governed by a Village Council which is currently administrated by 10 members appointed by the Palestinian National Authority (PNA).

References

Bibliography

External links
Welcome To al-Badan
Wadi al-Badan, Welcome to Palestine
Survey of Western Palestine, Map 12:  IAA, Wikimedia commons
 Al Badhan Village profile, Applied Research Institute–Jerusalem (ARIJ)
Al Badhan, aerial photo, ARIJ
Development Priorities and Needs in Al Badhan, ARIJ

Nablus Governorate
Villages in the West Bank
Municipalities of the State of Palestine
Ancient Samaritan settlements